Nicole Lapin (born March 7, 1984) is an American television news anchor, author and businesswoman. She is known for being an American news anchor on CNBC, CNN and Bloomberg. Lapin also served as a finance correspondent for Morning Joe on MSNBC and The Today Show on NBC. She is The New York Times bestselling author of Rich Bitch, Boss Bitch and Becoming Super Woman. In September 2019 her book Becoming Super Woman, a 12-step plan to go from burnout to balance was released. In February 2022, her fourth book Miss Independent was released, debuting  on The Wall Street Journal bestseller's list in the category "Hardcover Business".

She is currently the host of Hatched, a business competition show on The CW Network, airing Saturday mornings for the second season. Lapin regularly appears on Good Morning America, Dr. Oz, CNN, Entertainment Tonight and major talk shows. as a business reporter and expert money commentator. She is the co-host, along with the editor-in-chief of Entrepreneur Jason Feifer, of the podcast "Hush Money" on iHeartRadio. She is the current host of her own “Money Rehab with Nicole Lapin” daily iHeartradio show.  She is also currently the host of iHeartRadio's "Money Rehab with Nicole Lapin," a daily podcast about money habits.

Early life and education
Lapin was born and raised in Los Angeles, California, the daughter of a scientist and a beauty queen. Her family is Jewish. Lapin became interested in journalism while watching coverage of the Gulf War on CNN, which her parents barred her from watching due to "the perceived negativity and carnage." Lapin got her first broadcast experience when she was in high school and worked as the news anchor for the Public-access television cable TV station. She did writing programs at Harvard when she was 15. She received her BA from the Medill School of Journalism at Northwestern University, as the valedictorian of her class. She graduated summa cum laude, also earning honors for a second major in political science. Even though she took time off to work professionally, she was still the youngest in her class. Lapin studied European Union politics at L'Institut d'études politiques de Paris.

Career
Lapin began her career as a correspondent at CBS Stations in South Dakota and Kentucky. She also served as an investigative "I-Team" reporter for KPSP-LP in Palm Springs, California. There, she reported live from San Quentin Prison during the execution of Stanley Williams. Lapin also worked as a reporter on the floor of the Chicago Mercantile Exchange for First Business network in Chicago.

She joined CNN in 2005, becoming one of the youngest anchors in the network's history. She has anchored major events like the Virginia Tech massacre, Israel-Hezbollah conflict, and the 2008 Presidential election. In 2007, she created an interview series at CNN called "Young People Who Rock" where she talks with people under the age of 30 who are doing remarkable things. In 2009, Lapin reported on location in Los Angeles during Michael Jackson's memorial service. She also interviewed Governor Arnold Schwarzenegger one-on-one during California's budget crisis. She was one of the anchors to launch CNN Live, the network's 24-hour online streaming news network and regularly appeared on CNN Headline News, CNN, and CNN International.

Lapin joined CNBC in January 2010 as the anchor based in New York on the only globally aired show on the network, Worldwide Exchange joining CNBC Europe's Ross Westgate in London and CNBC Asia's Christine Tan in Singapore. In June 2010, she added the role co-anchoring The Kudlow Report from 7-8pm EST to her CNBC duties. During her time on CNBC, she regularly interviewed Fortune 500 CEOs and broke news of Initial Public Offerings and pre-market movements. Lapin anchored her show from Washington, D.C. during the U.S. budget crisis of 2011. Lapin reported extensively in-the-field on the fiscal woes of the U.S. States with a series called "States of Pain" and followed the renaissance of the "Made in America" movement, highlighting its effect on the global economy. She contributed a regular column on CNBC.com with racy titles like "Waking Up With Nicole Lapin" that recapped overnight stock market movements and unconventional stories like the business of sex. Her reporting on alternative investments like comic books, wine and horses also appeared in USA Today.

During her time at NBC, Lapin reported on personal finance for Today. She had a live daily business update on Morning Joe and MSNBC. She also contributed to NBC affiliate stations across the country with business updates, including KNBC in Los Angeles and WNBC in New York. She became the first "crossover" example of the NBCUniversal-Comcast deal by contributing business reports to The Golf Channel's "Morning Drive" program.

In September 2012, it was announced that Lapin joined Bloomberg Television as an anchor and special correspondent. While at Bloomberg, she anchored "Bloomberg West" in both San Francisco and New York City. She covered technology and interview startup founders like LinkedIn's Jeff Weiner, Zappos’ Tony Hsieh and Foursquare's Dennis Crowley. Lapin also reported on technology in football, interviewing the owners of the 49ers and Cowboys.

In 2013, Lapin was named a special correspondent, focusing on the business of Hollywood, for omg! Insider, Entertainment Tonight and the money saving correspondent for The Wendy Williams Show.

Lapin founded her own production company to produce accessible money content geared toward women. The company created a financial news website Recessionista, which served as the inspiration show on Ora TV, Carlos Slim and Larry King's network. In 2014, she announced an AOL Originals show that she hosts and executive produces called I'll Never Forget My First, in which she interviews influential women about the first time they knew they "made it." Lapin's company also launched CASH Smartwatch, the first wearable device that enabled users to track his or her spending throughout the day with retail partner HSN.

In 2014, Harlequin (now HarperCollins) announced that it is publishing Lapin's book Rich Bitch, a personal finance guide for women, in a six-figure deal. The book sold out on Amazon.com the first week and made The New York Times Bestseller list. In 2015, Lapin inked a significant six-figure deal with Crown Business, a division of Penguin Random House, for her second book entitled Boss Bitch. In 2018, BenBella announced they are publishing Lapin's third book, Becoming Super Woman." In October 2020, she signed a seven-book seven-figure deal with HarperCollins Leadership.

Redbook magazine named Lapin their permanent money columnist in 2015, a first for a Hearst Corporation publication.

Also in 2015, she was named the host and only female judge of Hatched, a business competition show on The CW Network, airing Saturday mornings. The show was renewed for its second season in 2016 on CBS.

In 2017, Nicole Lapin was a judge on the Miss America 2017 pageant show. 

In 2018 she launched online masterclasses "The Money Money School" and "The Boss School". On "The Boss School" podcast, she interviews CEOs and founders including Bobbi Brown and Alli Webb. In 2019 she was named a professor in the Jack Welch School of Business at Strayer University alongside Queen Latifah and Jon Steinberg.

She has contributed financial reports and segments to Rachael Ray, The Kelly Clarkson Show, The Doctors and Access Hollywood. Lapin currently serves as a regular money expert for GMA3 and E! Daily Pop on-air and Forbes, Entrepreneur and Thrive online.

Lapin had been the host of 2 seasons of Hatched, a business competition reality show aimed at kids, airing on CBS and The CW alongside investor Carter Milliken Reum. She has been the co-host, along with the editor-in-chief of Entrepreneur Jason Feifer, of the podcast "Hush Money" on iHeartradio. Lapin regularly appears on Good Morning America, The Talk, Daily Pop on E! News and other major talk shows as a business reporter and expert money commentator.

Accolades
Lapin has been on the cover of PowerGirls Magazine and Eliza magazine. She is the 2008 recipient of the "Power 30 under 30" award. In 2011, she was named a judge for the Tribeca Film Festival. In 2016 she was named a judge for Miss America.

Lapin was named the "Money Idol" of the Year in the GoBankingRates Best Money Expert Competition, the first female to ever win the competition and beating out Tony Robbins, Dave Ramsey and Tim Ferriss. She won two years in a row.

In 2011, Nicole Lapin was named New York City's No. 1 bachelorette in the media by The New York Observer.

In 2018, she was named to Young Jewish Professionals "40 under 40" along with the founder of The Skimm Danielle Weisberg.

Philanthropy
Lapin served an ambassador for the Starlight Starbright Children's Foundation, and created a chat series called "Being Smart is Cool" that "educates terminally ill children on global issues". Lapin has also served as an ambassador for Points of Light and launched a birthday campaign with The United Nation's "Girl Up" initiative.

She currently serves as a "smile ambassador," with Jessica Simpson, for Operation Smile. She is on the advisory board of Step Up and sits on the all-female board of Women in Need.

Personal life
In 2020 she talked about a miscarriage she had and launched a petition for companies to start miscarriage leave policies. She also had Senator Tammy Duckworth on her show to discuss proposed legislation which would allow women to take time off after pregnancy loss.

Lapin has been a vegetarian since she was young and a vegan since 2002.

She currently lives with her fiancé  Joe Sanberg in Los Angeles.

In the past, Lapin dated Brian Stelter and Twitter founder Jack Dorsey and lived with billionaire Michael G. Rubin for 4 years.

Bibliography 

 2016 - Rich Bitch: A Simple 12-Step Plan for Getting Your Financial Life Together...Finally 
 2017 - Boss Bitch: A Simple 12-Step Plan to Take Charge of Your Career 
 2019 - Becoming Super Woman 
 2022 - Miss Independent: A Simple 12-Step Plan to Start Investing and Grow Your Own Wealth

See also
 List of vegans

References

External links

1984 births
American business writers
Women business writers
American financial businesspeople
20th-century American Jews
American people of Israeli descent
American television news anchors
American women in business
American women journalists
American women writers
Businesspeople from Los Angeles
CNBC people
CNN people
Living people
Medill School of Journalism alumni
Writers from Los Angeles
MSNBC people
21st-century American Jews